Andrew "Pop" Wansel (born April 27, 1988) is an American record producer, musician and songwriter from Philadelphia, Pennsylvania. As the son of Philadelphia soul musician Dexter Wansel, Pop grew up in the music industry and began writing and producing his own music at the age of ten, citing rapper Nas and Motown songwriting team Holland–Dozier–Holland as his early inspirations.

In 2006, Pop reached out to Nicki Minaj via Myspace message looking to collaborate. After her initial interest, he sent her an idea that would eventually become the basis for "Your Love". Nicki recorded the track and the unmastered demo subsequently leaked in 2009, landing at No. 1 on Billboards Hot Rap Songs.

 Discography 

 Production and Songwriting credits 

Awards and nominations
BMI Awards

|-
| 2017
| "Here" (Alessia Cara)
| Pop Song of the Year
| 
|}

Grammy Awards

|-
|2015| "Good Kisser" (Usher)
| Best R&B Song
|  
|}

iHeartRadio Music Awards

|-
|2018'
| Pop Wansel
| Producer of the Year
| 
|}

References

External links
 

1988 births
Living people
American male songwriters
Record producers from Pennsylvania
Musicians from Philadelphia